Syed Najibul Bashar Maizbhandari is the chairman of Bangladesh Tarikat Federation and the incumbent Member of Parliament of the Chittagong-2 constituency.

Early life
Maizbhandari was born on 2 December 1959, to a Bengali Muslim family of Syeds belonging to the Maizbhandaria tariqah in Chittagong District, East Pakistan (now Bangladesh). He completed his education up until he gained his Higher Secondary School Certificate.

Career
During the 1991 Bangladeshi general elections, Maizbhandari successfully won a seat in the Chittagong-4 constituency as an Awami League candidate. However, he later became affiliated with the Bangladesh Nationalist Party. He represented them as a candidate for the same constituency in the 2001 Bangladeshi general election, but did not win a seat.

He left the Bangladesh Nationalist Party in 2005 because the party had formed an alliance with the Jamaat-e-Islami, which Maizbhandari accuses of supporting terrorists who attack dargahs (Sufi shrines); Maizbhandari is the president of the Bangladesh Dargah Mazar Federation, an association of shrines. In the same year, he founded the Bangladesh Tarikat Federation political party which had experienced its first elections in 2008 with 45 candidates but no seats won in parliament.

On 5 January 2014, Maizbhandari won a seat in the Chittagong-2 representing his party and managed to keep this seat again in the 2018 Bangladeshi general election. He is the Chairman of Bangladesh Tarikat Federation, ailed of the Awami League.

References

Bangladesh Tarikat Federation politicians
Living people
1959 births
10th Jatiya Sangsad members
Bangladeshi political party founders
People from Fatikchhari Upazila
Bangladeshi Sufis
Bangladeshi people of Arab descent
Bengali Muslim scholars of Islam